SCORE Class 11 is a stock production Volkswagen Beetle class that competes in the SCORE off-road race series, including the Baja 1000, Baja 500, Baja Sur 500, San Felipe 250 and the SCORE Desert Challenge. Class 11 is the most grueling of all off-road race vehicles as they are pure stock with modifications limited to only safety reinforcement and ground clearance. Class 11 repeat champion Eric Solórzano was featured in Dust to Glory, a documentary on the 2003 Baja 1000.

Vehicle description
Vehicles must be a stock Volkswagen Type 1 sedan.

Class requirements

Safety
A full roll cage must be installed following SCORE International safety requirements by weight of vehicle.

Any manufacturer of seats may be used. 5 point seat belts must be used. For SCORE racing a fuel cell type gas tank must be used. Race fuel cells may also be used in any location. Battery must be relocated. Windshield and other windows are optional. Window nets must be installed in passenger and driver windows. two headlights, two tail/brake lights, reverse light, amber light and blue light must be installed.

Brakes
Stock brake drums must be used, no disk brakes. Stock master cylinder must be used.

Engine
Engine must utilize VW series Type 1, 1600cc, U.S. model sedan and components and dimensions. Maximum 1600cc as delivered from the factory. Additional modification limitations exist. Pistons, stock 3 ring. Heads must be stock single or dual port heads 40mm. Unlimited compression, race gas OK. Stock carburetor 30 PICT 1,2 or 3.

Class 11 vehicles typically have 60-80 horsepower. Single Carburated, dual or single port. Electronic ignitions are allowed. No dry sumps. Larger oil pumps may be installed, and external coolers as well.

Suspension
Suspension is stock with minor allowances to increase ground clearance and strength.  Front torsion housing may be cut and rotated, torsion bars are open and may be of any origin. Front Shocks must be 2" of less in stock location. One shock per wheel. Rear shocks must be 18" eye to eye, and may be relocated, but must bolt directly to rear trailing arm or swing axle.  Bypass shocks are not allowed. No hydraulic bump stops. External reservoirs are allowed. Rear torsion adjuster may be installed, and any torsion bar may be used.

Body
Body must maintain the original shape, size, configuration, and appearance. Type 1 bodies only allowed. Additional stock limitations exist for this class. No super beetles.

Transmission
Type 1 four-speed transaxle only. Must use stock gears, differential is open, must run a 4.12 ring and pinion.

Notable race teams
 CBCFS Racing - 1116 - Paul Nauleau
 Desert Dingo Racing - Jim Graham
 Tecate - 1111 - Eric Solórzano
 Johnson Racing 1100 in SNORE
 Other Level Racing 1180 in SNORE
 Sergio EL COYOTE, Porfirio EL INDIO Gutierrez
 Team H12:One Racing - 1121 - Dennis Hollenbeck Chairez
 Project Baja - 1137 - Matt Fisher/Josh McGuckin
 Mooch Racing - 1156 - Arthur Penner
 ORS Racing - 1152 - Hector Maymes
Robalonches Racing - 1113 - Mario Vasquez
C11J Motorsports - 1189 - Joey Smith/Audra Smith aka Class 11 Junkies

References

SCORE International (2006). "2006-2010 Off-Road Racing Rules and Regulations".
SCORE International (2011). "2011-2015 Off-Road Racing Rules and Regulations"
SCORE International. " 2009 New Classes & Existing Class Rule Amendments"

External links
Official SCORE International website
Official SCORE International Journal
Official SCORE International Carbon TV channel
Class 11 Coalition
Class 11 Junkies

Slowest Way South Documentary

Off-road racing